Mahāsammata (also spelled Maha Samrat; lit. "the Great Elect"), also known as Khattiya and Rāja, was the first monarch of the world according to Buddhist tradition. The chronicles of Theravada Buddhist tradition such as Mahāvaṃsa and Maha Yazawin state that he was the founder of the Sakya dynasty, to which the historical Buddha belonged. He was the first of the eleven world monarchs named Maha Sammata, each of whom founded the eleven dynasties that existed from the beginning to the day of the Buddha.

Brief
The future king was born "in the beginning of the world" in Jambudvīpa, the only habitable continent on earth, to a family descended from the solar race. As no leaders or political orders were in existence, the people elected him to be their king. He ascended to the throne with the title Mahāsammata ("the Great Elect", He Who is designated by people), and took Manikpala as his queen. As king, he constituted the order of the city-state, the various duties and offices defined for the state, and the boundaries of armies of their protection. He also compiled the first dhammasattha (law treatise).

According to the Mahāvaṃsa Ṭīkā (sub-commentaries), Mahāsammata was the bodhisatta in a previous life. The Jātaka commentary identifies the primeval king Mahāmandhātā(Emperor Mandatus) as being the bodhisatta as well, Mahāmandhata being the great-great-great-great grandson of Mahāsammata. Mahāmandhātā is given as an example of one who could obtain great sense-pleasure (and even to the glory of the gods) in his lifetime, but still had to die. The Cetiya Jātaka states that the lifespan of Mahāsammata was an asankheyya long (literally, "cannot be calculated").

Aftermath

The dynasty he founded was to have a line of 63,000 kings. That dynasty eventually fell because people forgot religion (dharma). The second dynasty was founded by the founder who took the title Mahāsammata II. That dynasty too eventually fell after another 63,000 kings later. The fall of the second dynasty was followed by the foundation of the third dynasty. The cycle of rising and falling dynasties continued to the day of the historical Buddha, over 2500 years ago. Based on the reporting in the Sinhalese and Burmese chronicles, each of the eleven cycles lasted 800 billion years, meaning the earth is 10 trillion years old. According to tradition, there were 334,569 kings (of the 11 dynasties) from Mahāsammata to the time of the historical Buddha.

According to Theravada tradition, a total of 28 Buddhas have appeared including the historical Buddha. The first 24 Buddhas appeared in the first seven cycles. The last four Buddhas appeared in the most recent four cycles.

Significance
Maha Sammata is mentioned in various Buddhist traditions. In addition to the Theravada accounts, Tibetan and Mongolian Buddhist schools describe him as the founder of political thought.

See also
 Buddhist cosmology
 Buddhist mythology
 Burmese chronicles
 Buddhist kingship
 Sinhalese chronicles

References

Bibliography
 
 
 
 
 
 
 
 Sudheer Maurya,(2020). Manikpala Mahasammat. Aman Prakashan. .

Buddhist mythology